Villanova d'Ardenghi is a comune (municipality) in the Province of Pavia in the Italian region Lombardy, located about 35 km southwest of Milan and about 9 km west of Pavia. As of 31 December 2004, it had a population of 711 and an area of 6.8 km².

Villanova d'Ardenghi borders the following municipalities: Carbonara al Ticino, Gropello Cairoli, Zerbolò, Zinasco.

Demographic evolution

References

Cities and towns in Lombardy